Joel H. Shapiro is an American mathematician, active in the field of composition operators. He is the author of the book Composition Operators and Classical Function Theory, and the American Mathematical Society memoir "Cyclic Phenomena for Composition Operators" (Memoirs of the American Math. Society #596, Vol. 125, 1997, pp. 1–105), with Paul Bourdon.

Career
Shapiro completed his PhD thesis entitled  "Linear Functionals on Non-Locally Convex Spaces" under the supervision of Allen Shields in 1969 at the University of Michigan. Upon graduating, he became a research associate at Queen's University, Canada, then from 1970 onwards was at Michigan State University, becoming a full professor in 1979. He stayed at Michigan State until 2006, when he retired and became an adjunct professor at Portland State University in Oregon.

Shapiro discovered some of the properties of composition operators, including a study of the cyclic properties of such operators and the first calculations of the essential norm  for composition operators on the Hardy spaces of the Unit disc.

References

External links
Joel Shapiro's Homepage

Living people
20th-century American mathematicians
21st-century American mathematicians
University of Michigan alumni
Case Western Reserve University alumni
Academic staff of Queen's University at Kingston
Michigan State University faculty
Portland State University faculty
Year of birth missing (living people)